NGC 318 is a lenticular galaxy in the constellation Pisces. It was discovered on November 29, 1850 by Bindon Stoney.

References

External links 
 

0318
18501129
Pisces (constellation)
Lenticular galaxies
003465